Jan Kreczmar (6 May 1908 in Warsaw - 29 August 1972 in Warsaw) was a Polish theatre and film actor.

He was a rector of the National Higher School of Theatre in Warsaw in the years 1949-55 and 1956-67.

He was married to actress Justyna Kreczmarowa. Brother of the theatre director Jerzy Kreczmar.

Filmography

References

External links

1908 births
1972 deaths
Polish male stage actors
Polish male film actors
20th-century Polish male actors